This is a list of the National Register of Historic Places listings in Isle Royale National Park.

This is intended to be a complete list of the properties and districts on the National Register of Historic Places in Isle Royale National Park, Michigan, United States.  The locations of National Register properties and districts for which the latitude and longitude coordinates are included below, may be seen in a Google map.

There are 21 properties and districts listed on the National Register in the park.

Current listings 

{{NRHP row
|pos=9
|refnum=84001752
|type=NRHP
|article=SS Henry Chisholm
|name=HENRY CHISHOLM
|address=Near Rock of Ages Light
|city=Isle Royale National Park
|county=Keweenaw County, Michigan
|date=1984-06-14
|image=Henry Chisholm.jpg
|lat=47.857778
|lon=-89.325556
|description=The Henry Chisholm was a wooden freighter built in 1880, and was the largest wooden "steam barge" ever built in Cleveland, approaching the practical size limit for a wooden vessel of its type.  In October 1898, the Chisholm left Duluth, Minnesota, towing the 220-foot schooner John Martin.  A storm blew up and the Martin was cast off.   After the gale lessened, the Chisholm spent the next few days searching for the Martin, and struck a reef near the Rock of Ages Light while attempting to enter Washington Harbor.  Portions of the Chisholm'''s hull are intermingled with the wreckage of the SS Cumberland, which had sunk earlier in 1877.
|commonscat=Henry Chisholm (ship, 1880)
}}

|--
|}

 See also 
 National Register of Historic Places listings in Keweenaw County, Michigan
 National Register of Historic Places listings in Michigan

 References 

Carrell, Toni. National Register of Historic Places Inventory - Nomination Form: Shipwrecks of Isle Royale National Park.'' National Park Service 1983